This article lists political parties in El Salvador.

Political culture 
El Salvador has a multi-party system. Two political parties, the Nationalist Republican Alliance (ARENA) and the Farabundo Martí National Liberation Front (FMLN), have tended to dominate elections. ARENA candidates won four consecutive presidential elections until the election of Mauricio Funes of the FMLN in March 2009.

Geographically, the departments of the Central region, especially the capital and the coastal regions, known as departamentos rojos, or red departments, are relatively Leftist. The departamentos azules, or blue departments in the east, western and highland regions are relatively conservative.

In February 2021, El Salvador's legislative election was an important breakthrough. The new party, founded by President Nayib Bukele, Nuevas Ideas, won around two-thirds of votes with its allies (GANA-New Ideas). His party won supermajority 56 seats in the 84-seat parliament. Bukele became the country’s most powerful leader in three decades.

Political parties

Major parties

Minor parties 

Christian Force (Fuerza Cristiana, FC)
Democratic Change (Cambio Democrático, CD)
National Action Party (Partido Acción Nacional, PAN) 
National Liberal Party (Partido Nacional Liberal, PNL)
Popular Action (Acción Popular, AP)
Republican Party for National Unity (Partido Republicano de Union Nacional, PRUN)
Republican People's Party (Partido Popular Republicano, PPR)
Salvadoran Democracy (Democracia Salvadoreña, DS)
Salvadoran Independent Party (Partido Independiente Salvadoreño, PAIS)
Salvadoran Patriotic Fraternity (Fraternidad Patriota Salvadoreña FPS)
Social Democratic Party (Partido Social Demócrata, PSD)
United Democratic Centre  (Centro Democrático Unido, CDU)
Unity Movement (Unidad Movimiento, UNIDAD)

Defunct 

Authentic Constitutional Party (Partido Constitucional Auténtico, PCA)
Authentic Democratic Christian Movement (Movimiento Cristiano Democrático Auténtico, MCDA)
Constitutional Party (Partido Constitucional, PC)
Democratic Action (Acción Democrático, AD)
Democratic Convergence (Convergencia Democrática, CD)
Democratic Republican League (Lega Republicana Democrática, LRD)
Democratic Union Party (Partido de Unión Democrático, PUD)
Labor Party (Partido Laborista, PL)
Movement of National Solidarity (Movimiento de Solidaridad Nacional, MSN)
Movement of Unity (Movimiento de Unidad, MU)
National Democratic Party (Partido Democrático Nacional, PDN)
National Development Party, (Partido de Desarrollo Nacional, PDN)
National Opposing Union (Unión Nacional Opuesto, UNO)
National Pro Patria Party (Partido Nacional Pro Patria, PNPP)
National Republican Party (Partido Republicano Nacional, PRN)
Party of the United People and the New Deal (Partido de Pueblo Unido y el Nuevo Acuerdo, PPUNA)
Popular Orientation Party (Partido de Orientación Popular, POP)
Progressive Fraternal Party (Partido Fraternal Progresista, PFP)
Renewal Movement (Movimiento Renovador, MR)
Renovated Action Party (Partido de Acción Renovado, PAR)
Renovating Action Party (Partido de Acción Renovando, PAR)
Republican Social Front (Frente Social Republicana, FSR)
Revolutionary Party of Democratic Unification (Partido Revolucionario de Unificación Democrática, PRUD)
Salvadoran Authentic Institutional Party (Partido Institucional Auténtico Salvadoreño, PIAS)
Salvadoran People's Party (Partido del Pueblo Salvadoreño, PPS)
Social Christian Union (Union Social Cristiana, UCS)
Social Democratic Party (Partido Social Demócrata, PSD)
Social Democratic Unification Party (Partido de Unificación Democrático Social, PUDS)
Stable Republican Centrist Movement (Movimiento Centrista Republicana Estable, MCRE)
United Independent Democratic Front (Frente Democrática Independiente Unida, FDIR)
Zaratista Party (Partido Zaratista, PZ)

See also
 Elections in El Salvador
 Politics of El Salvador

References

El Salvador
 
Political parties
Political parties
El Salvador